According to the sages, the Vedas and the Puranas, whenever righteousness decreases and the unrighteous increase, Vishnu assumes an earthly form (avatar) to defeat the wicked and protect his devotees.

There are many stories told about specific incarnations of Vishnu. Shiva describes five in detail.

Curse on Gatekeepers of Vishnu

Through the curse of the Brahmana Sanakadi, two of Lord Vishnu's gatekeepers are turned into Asuras. The two become killers, destructive, and greatly feared. Lord Vishnu becomes the son of Dasaratha and Kausalya in order to defeat them. Lord Vishnu kills one of the Asuras, (Hiranyaksha), by assuming the form of a boar (Varaha); the other (Hiranyakashyapa) in the form of a man-lion chimera.

Curse of Jalandhar's wife

In another time, there is a great Rakshasa named Jalandhara. Shiva fights a fierce battle against him, but is unable to kill the demon. Ram learns that Jalandhara's immunity is due to the piousness of his wife, Vrinda. So, Vishnu takes the form of Jalandhara in front of Vrinda, and she embraces him thinking he is her husband. When Vrinda realizes she was tricked, she curses Vishnu that some day his own wife will be stolen from him, and then commits suicide. With Vrinda now deceased, Shiva is able to defeat Jalandhara.

Curse of Narada

A man named Narada is cursed that he can never stay in one place. Eventually in his wanderings, he comes upon a huge cave in the Himalayas beside the  Ganges river. The sight of the beautiful mountain, the river and the woods causes Narada to feel such deep devotion for Vishnu that the very thought of Vishnu destroys the curse upon him. Narada becomes so pure that he attains Samādhi.

Seeing Narada's holiness, the god Indra fears that Narada may be after his kingdom. He asks Kamadeva, god of desire, to break Narada's Samādhi. Kamadeva fails in this task, and Narada becomes arrogant over his victory.

When Vishnu came learns that the seed of a powerful tree of vanity has germinated, then he vows to uproot it immediately. He creates a town even more beautiful than his own abode, and there he takes the form of Vishwamohini, the beautiful princess of the town, who is seeking a husband. Kings come from far and wide as suitors, and of course so did Narada went to that town. When Narada beholds Vishwamohini's beauty, the sage forgets his Vairagya and cannot take his eyes off her. The sage resolved to marry the princess. He prayed to Vishnu and asked for his help in winning "the girl" over: — "O Lord! Please give me your appearance as there is no other way I can get that princess. O Lord! Whatever is beneficial to me, please do that quickly. I am your devotee." Pleased that his Maya had worked so well, Vishnu responds— "O Narada! Listen, whatever is the best for you, I will do only that, nothing else. My word is never untrue. O Yogi Rishi! Listen, if a patient distraught with disease asks for a poison the doctor does not prescribe it. Likewise I've resolved to help you."

Narada immediately travels to where the Swayamvara is taking place. He did not realize that Vishnu had given him, for his own good, a very hideous form. Seeing his monkey-like face and terrible body, the princess ignored him completely. The princess chooses another king (actually Vishnu in disguise) to be her husband. Two Jaya and Vijaya who had also assembled there disguised as ridiculed Narada, telling him to look in a mirror. When Narada learns he had been tricked, he becomes furious and curses them, and then curses Vishnu himself, that since Vishnu took away his love, that someday Vishnu's love should be taken away; and that since Vishnu gave him a monkey-like form, that some day only monkeys would help him.

Respecting the curse, Vishnu removes the Maya of the princess. Realizing his error, the sage begs for mercy. Vishnu tells him to chant Shiva Sahasranama. To the two gatekeepers who had taunted Narada earlier, Vishnu tells them that in another time, in the guise of a human, he will slay them and they will attain Moksha.

Boon to Manu–Satarupa

Svayambhuva Manu and his wife Satarupa underwent tremendous Tapa, living in the forest and taking a diet of only water for six thousand years, then only air for seven thousand years, then not even air for another ten thousand years. Seeing their tremendous Tapa Brahma and Shiva repeatedly tempted them in many ways and encouraged them ask for some boon, but the stoic king and queen always refused. Seeing this, Vishnu spoke to them -- ‘ask for a boon’. So devoted to Hari were they that even as the sound passed through their ears, the king and queen's bodies which withered to skeletons from their Tapas, became as beautiful and muscular again as if they had just left home. Joyfully, the king responded that they wished to see Vishnu. The gentle, respectful and soaked in love words of the king-queen were very endearing to Vishnu and he manifested himself.

Manu and Satarupa fell straight on the ground in prostration. Narayan touched their foreheads and lifted them at once. Then Vishnu said — "Knowing me to be extremely happy and immensely generous, whatever pleases your mind ask for that boon". The king responded, "I want to have a son like you." Seeing the king's love and listening to his priceless words Mahavishnu spoke — "So be it. O king! Where should I search the other like me! Hence I myself would be your son."

Seeing the queen with clasped hands God said — "O queen! Whatever be your wish, ask for that boon." She said — "O lord! That [same] bliss, that [same] state, that [same] Bhakti, that [same] love, that same Jnana and that [same] mode of life [as you have] kindly bestow on us." Listening to the gentle, mysterious and fascinating words of the queen Vishnu said — "Whatever wish is in your mind, all that I give you, never doubt it. O mother! Due to my benevolence your divine Jnana will never be destroyed." (That is, they are holy/immortal.)

Then the king said — "O lord! I have one more request.... Like a fish cannot survive without water, [let] that way my life be dependent on you." Vishnu said — "So be it. [For now, come] stay in the [celestial] capital Amaravati [with me]....[A]fter some time, you will be the king of [the earthly kingdom] Awadh (Kosala or Ayodhya). Then I will be your son. Adorning a human body created as per my wish I will manifest myself in your home."

After that, the king and queen remained in their Ashram for some time before leaving their bodies painlessly and going to Amaravati

Curse on Pratapbhanu

Once upon a time there was an Ashram in the forest wherein in the deceptive guise of a Rishi lived a king who had escaped from the battle where his kingdom was taken. One day a visitor arrived at the hermitage, whom the false sage immediately recognized as King Pratapbhanu. However, the king was exhausted and he not recognize the hermit. The false sage told the king to ask for whatever he likes. The king replied that he wished his body to be free from aging, death and misery, that no one could win over him in the battle, and for his rule to last for a hundred Kalpa. The false sage told the king that he would prepare food, and that the king should serve it without mentioning the sage's identity, and that whoever eats that food will then be under the king's complete control.

The king agreed, and the false sage got to work. As promised, he delivered much cooked meat for the feast to the king, but which secretly had the flesh of slaughtered Brahmins mixed into it. King Pratapbhanu did not suspect a thing, but the moment he started serving the food, an announcement came from the sky warning all the guests that the feast was of human flesh. Hearing this, the Brahmin sitting for the feast cursed King Pratapbhanu so that he and his family became the rakshasa called Ravana.

 Rama
 Genealogy of Rama
 Nama sankeerthanam
 Ram Nam
 Ramayana

Notes

References

Rama